PlasmoDB is a biological database for the genus Plasmodium. The database is a member of the EuPathDB project. The database contains extensive genome, proteome and metabolome information relating to malaria parasites.

See also
 Plasmodium
 Malaria

References

External links
 

Genome databases
PlasmoDB